Hey Donald is an album by the American jazz saxophonist Roscoe Mitchell, recorded in 1994 and released on Delmark. It was the first recording by a quartet featuring pianist Jodie Christian, bassist Malachi Favors and drummer Albert "Tootie" Heath. The album is dedicated to Earth Wind & Fire saxophonist Donald Myrick.

Reception

In his review for AllMusic, Scott Yanow states: "In general Mitchell saves the more boppish pieces for his tenor while on soprano his intense sound creates a drone effect reminiscent a bit of bagpipes."

The Penguin Guide to Jazz notes that "when the rhythm section are playing straight time and setting up a groove underneath, Mitchell's honking and mordant saxophone often sounds frankly ludicrous."

Track listing
All compositions by Roscoe Mitchell except as indicated
 "Walking in the Moonlight" (Roscoe Mitchell Sr.) – 6:55
 "Dragons" – 6:48 
 "Jeremy" (Jodie Christian) – 1:54 
 "The El" – 2:51
 "Hey Donald" – 7:45
 "Keep On Keeping On" (Malachi Favors) – 2:44
 "The Band Room" – 2:27
 "Englewood High School" – 4:06
 "Zero" (Lester Bowie) – 4:29
 "Song for Rwanda" – 6:23
 "58th Street" – 4:33
 "See You at the Fair" – 5:26

Personnel
Roscoe Mitchell - alto sax, tenor sax, soprano sax, sopranino sax, flute
Jodie Christian – piano 
Malachi Favors – bass
Albert "Tootie" Heath – drums, percussion

References

1995 albums
Roscoe Mitchell albums
Albums produced by Bob Koester
Delmark Records albums